The 1829 New Hampshire gubernatorial election was held on March 10, 1829.

Incumbent National Republican Governor John Bell was defeated by Democratic nominee Benjamin Pierce in a re-match of the previous year's election.

General election

Candidates
John Bell, National Republican, incumbent Governor
Benjamin Pierce, Democratic, former Governor

Results

Notes

References

1829
New Hampshire
Gubernatorial